Steve Bernard Cannon (1927–2009) was an American radio personality who spent 1964-1971 broadcasting from KSTP-AM, then a longer stretch hosting a drive time talk show in Minneapolis-St. Paul, Minnesota, the Cannon Mess, on WCCO Radio - 830 AM from 3pm-6pm and 3pm-7pm. from "the basement studio."

Both on KSTP and WCCO Cannon had a regular cast of self-voiced characters known as his "Lil Cannons" that included Ma Linger, Backlash Larue and Morgan Mundane (not to mention Contemporary Collins) through which he provided comedic relief as well as commentary on the topics of the day. He often made jokes about what he called "the crack management staff at 'CCO".

Cannon spent 26 years at WCCO, before he retired in 1997. He was inducted into the Pavek Museum of Broadcasting Hall of Fame in 2002. Early in his broadcast career Cannon was a TV host as children's show character "Wrangler Steve" on WMIN-TV 11 and later during newscasts on KSTP 5. Previous to WCCO, he had been heard in Minneapolis-St. Paul on KSTP-AM and WLOL, and in San Francisco on KGO.

Death
Steve Cannon died, aged 81, on April 6, 2009, from cancer.

References

External links
Aircheck recordings of Steve Cannon at radiotapes.com
Steve Cannon's profile at the Pavek Museum of Broadcasting's Hall of Fame
Photo Gallery of Steve Cannon from CBS Minnesota "The Cannon Mess"
Cannon as "Wrangler Steve" on WMIN-TV 11, 1954 at mnkidvid.com
Cannon profile at mnkidvid.com
Cannon as "Wrangler Steve" on WMIN-TV 11 at mnkidvid.com
Cannon in KSTP-TV promo material at Old Minneapolis

American talk radio hosts
Deaths from cancer in Minnesota
Radio personalities from Minneapolis
1927 births
2009 deaths
Place of birth missing
Minnesota North Stars announcers